Coppersmith may refer to:

Coppersmith, a person who works with copper and brass
Coppersmith (surname)
Coppersmith Hills, mountain range in Lassen County, California, United States
Coppersmith barbet (Megalaima haemacephala), bird found in India, Sri Lanka, southeast Asia and Indonesia
World CopperSmith, American metalwork company